Alan is a rural locality (an ulus) in Khorinsky District, Republic of Buryatia, Russia. The population was 323 as of 2010. There are 20 streets.

References 

Rural localities in Khorinsky District